Rajesh Jamandass Maru (born 28 October 1962 in Nairobi, Kenya) is a Kenyan-born English cricket coach and former cricketer. Maru was a right-handed batsman who bowled slow left-arm orthodox spin.

Maru was born at Nairobi in October 1962. He moved with his family to England in 1972, after his father had been headhunted by Mercedes-Benz. They settled in London, where Maru attended first attended Oakington Manor Primary School. He was encouraged by his teacher to take up cricket, where he was spotted at school trials by Jack Robertson.

Maru signed for Middlesex in 1980, making his first-class debut against Essex County Cricket Club and his List-A debut against Kent at Lord's. Maru spent two seasons with the club before leaving at the end of the 1982 season. During his two seasons with Middlesex Maru also represented England in five Youth Test matches and one Youth One Day International.

In 1984 Maru signed for Hampshire County Cricket Club. He would go on to play 213 first-class matches and 102 one-day matches for the county. Maru was part of the 1991 NatWest Trophy winning Hampshire team. After spending 14 years with the club Maru was released at the end of the 1998 County Championship season. His first-class career had yielded 527 wickets at a respectable average of 33.61, given he was playing for Hampshire at a time when Malcolm Marshall, Cardigan Connor and Shaun Udal were playing for the club.

Maru went on to appear in five one-day matches for the Hampshire Cricket Board in the NatWest Trophy competition and in the first season when that competition was renamed the Cheltenham and Gloucester Trophy. Maru's final professional game was against the Kent Cricket Board on 1 May 2001.

References

External links

1962 births
Living people
Cricketers from Nairobi
English people of Indian descent
Kenyan emigrants to the United Kingdom
Naturalised citizens of the United Kingdom
English cricketers
Middlesex cricketers
Hampshire cricketers
Hampshire Cricket Board cricketers
English cricket coaches